is a Japanese name meaning "fortunate" or sometimes "one who is from the Fukui prefecture". Notable people with the surname include:

, physical chemist who was awarded the Nobel Prize in Chemistry in 1981
, Japanese video game music composer, arranger and performer
, Japanese television announcer, best known as the head commentator of television program Iron Chef, referred as "Fukui-san" in the program
, Japanese footballer
, Japanese football player
, Japanese women's basketball player
, Japanese actress and television personality
, former commissioner of Nippon Professional Baseball
, Japanese jazz pianist
, Japanese movie director and screenwriter
, Japanese businessman, President and CEO of Honda
 Japanese politician, a member of the House of Representatives of Japan

See also
 Fukui (disambiguation)

Japanese-language surnames